Burkett is an unincorporated community in Coleman County, Texas, United States. Though unincorporated, Burkett has a post office, with the ZIP code of 76828.

Climate
The climate in this area is characterized by hot, humid summers and generally mild to cool winters.  According to the Köppen climate classification, Burkett has a humid subtropical climate, Cfa on climate maps.

References

Unincorporated communities in Coleman County, Texas
Unincorporated communities in Texas